John Hannum may refer to:

 John Hannum III, American politician, businessman and colonial militiaman
 John Berne Hannum, United States federal judge